Patrice Ossona de Mendez is a French mathematician specializing in topological graph theory who works as a researcher at the Centre national de la recherche scientifique in Paris. With Pierre Rosenstiehl, he is editor-in-chief of the European Journal of Combinatorics, a position he has held since 2009.

Education and career
Ossona de Mendez was born on 13 December 1966 in Paris. He represented France in the International Mathematical Olympiad in 1985, earning a bronze medal there. He studied at the École Normale Supérieure from 1986 until 1990, and completed his Ph.D. in 1994 from the School for Advanced Studies in the Social Sciences. His dissertation, jointly supervised by Rosenstiehl and Hubert de Fraysseix, concerned bipolar orientations of graphs.

He has worked at CNRS since 1995, and earned a habilitation in 2009 from the University of Bordeaux 1.

Book
With Jaroslav Nešetřil he is the author of the book Sparsity: Graphs, Structures, and Algorithms (Algorithms and Combinatorics 28, Springer, 2012), concerning the properties and applications of different types of sparse graph. This book  was included in ACM Computing Reviews
list of Notable Books and Articles of 2012.

See also
Left-right planarity test
Schnyder's theorem
Bounded expansion

References

External links
Home page
Orcid profile
Google scholar profile

1966 births
Living people
French mathematicians
Graph theorists
Academic staff of the University of Bordeaux